Annie Warren Gill   & Bar  (1862 – 2 March 1930) was a British nurse who served as president of the Royal College of Nursing in 1927.

Life
Gill was born on the Isle of Man and trained as a nurse at the Royal Infirmary of Edinburgh eventually being appointed as a head nurse (later retitled sister). She left the Infirmary in 1900 during the Second Boer War to serve as matron of the Edinburgh South-East of Scotland Hospital that had been relocated to South Africa. On completion of her assignment in South Africa she resumed her role at the Royal Infirmary for a time before being asked to return to the country as matron of a concentration camp in the Orange River Colony, for which she received the Royal Red Cross in October 1901. In June 1903 Gill was appointed to the position of matron of the Royal Berkshire Hospital before being elected in 1907 by the board of the Royal Infirmary of Edinburgh as matron, a position she held until 1925.

During the debate that led to the introduction of mandatory registration for nurses in the United Kingdom, Gill, as a member of the General Nursing Council for Scotland,  campaigned for separate registration in Scotland.

In the 1919 New Year Honours, Gill was awarded a bar to the Royal Red Cross in recognition of her service during World War I. She was president of the Scottish Matrons Association from 1910 to 1925 and president of the Royal College of Nursing in 1927. In June 1929 she was appointed Commander in the Civil Division of the Order of the British Empire.

Gill died in Hove on 2 March 1930.

Legacy
The Annie Warren Gill prize for Dietetics was created in her memory. In 2013 the Isle of Man College of Further & Higher Education named a building in her honour.

References

1862 births
1930 deaths
Manx people
Presidents of the Royal College of Nursing
British nurses
Commanders of the Order of the British Empire
Members of the Royal Red Cross
Nurses of the Royal Infirmary of Edinburgh